Long Beach Light also known as the Long Beach Harbor Light, is a lighthouse on Long Beach Harbor in California.

History
Long Beach Harbor Light looks different from a traditional lighthouse. Labeled the "robot light" when established in 1949, it is completely automated and was the forerunner of the new version of 20th-century lighthouses on America's West Coast. The three-story facility, of monolithic design, is built of concrete supported on six cement columns cast into six pockets of a crib. It had dual tone fog signals and a radio beacon.

In its commanding position in San Pedro's middle breakwater, the lighthouse was considered an uncanny mechanical wonder when first established. Later, another navigation light in the Long Beach area was erected atop the pilot station at the Port of Long Beach in 1968. Marking the harbor entrance channel, the light is accompanied by one of the United States Coast Guard's radar scanners.

This lighthouse is inaccessible to the public but can be viewed from East Ocean Boulevard at Long Beach Harbor.

See also

 List of lighthouses in the United States

References

External links
 

Lighthouses completed in 1949
Lighthouses in Los Angeles County, California
Buildings and structures in Long Beach, California